PFU may refer to:

PFU Limited, a Japanese information technology company
Plaque-forming unit, a measure used in virology
Peoples' Friendship University of Russia, an educational and research institution located in Moscownonaligned countries
Pfu DNA polymerase, an enzyme